Pangalan Islet is a low, uninhabited islet in northeastern Iloilo, Philippines. It is part of the municipality of Estancia under the jurisdiction of the barangay of Manipulon.

Location and geography

Pangalan is part of the Bayas Islets, which include Bayas Island, Manipulon Islet, and Magosipal Islet. Pangalan and Magosipal are connected by reefs, with no running water between them.

See also

 List of islands in the Philippines

References 

Islands of Iloilo
Uninhabited islands of the Philippines